Marchini is a family name of Italian origin. It may refer to: 

 Giannina Marchini, Italian sprinter and middle distance runner
 Davide Marchini, Italian football player
 Jonathan Marchini (born 1973), Bayesian statistician and professor of statistical genomics
 Libero Marchini, Italian football player
 Ron Marchini, American karateka 
 Simona Marchini, Italian actress and presenter
 Tasso Marchini (1907-1936), Italian Modernist painter

See also 
 Marchi
 Marchetti

Italian-language surnames